This article is a timeline of Vermilion County, Illinois history.

19th century

1800s
 1809 – The Illinois Territory is formed.

1810s
 1818 December 3 – Illinois is admitted to the Union.
 1819 November – Salt Springs becomes the first European settlement in what is to become Vermilion County.

1820s
 1826 January 18 – Vermilion County is created. 
 1826 March – The county is divided into two townships, Carroll in the south and Ripley in the north.
 1826 – James Haworth plats the town of Georgetown.
 1827 January – Salt Springs, at the mouth of the North Fork of the Vermilion River, is made the county seat.
 1827 January 31 – The future site of Danville is identified as the new county seat.
 1827 April 10 – Lots in the new town of Danville go on sale.
 1827 May – Post office at Danville opens in the home of Amos Williams.
 1828 – Post office at Georgetown opens.

1830s
 1833 – Champaign County  is founded to the west, taking a strip ten miles wide from the west side of Vermilion County.
 1833 – Iroquois County is founded to the north, and Vermilion County is extended by 6 miles on the north side.
 1835 – Daniel Beckwith (after whom Danville was named) dies of pneumonia following a horseback ride from Washington.
 1837 – The town of Franklin is founded near the future site of Bismarck, but only lasts a few years.
 1838 September 17–20 – The Potawatomi Trail of Death camps at Sandusky Point near what became the town of Catlin.
 1839 – Post office at the future site of Rossville opens.

1840s
 1843 – The town of Myersville is founded near the future site of Bismarck.

1850s
 1851 – Vermilion County is divided into eight townships:  Danville,  Georgetown, Elwood, Carroll, Ross, Middlefork, Newell (first called Richland), and Pilot.
 1851 – B. E. Conkey founds Conkeytown.
 1856 – Blount Township is created.
 1857 – Mann's Chapel is constructed south of the future site of Rossville.
 1858 – Catlin Township is created.
 1858 – Abraham Lincoln gives a speech in Danville at the home of Dr. William Fithian (now the Vermilion County Museum) while campaigning for U.S. Senator against Stephen A. Douglas.
 1859 – Ford County is created from an unorganized territory that had been attached to Vermilion County.

1860s
 1862 – Grant Township is created.
 1862 – The town of Rossville is founded.
 1864 – Butler Township is created.
 1866 – Vance Township is created.
 1866 – Josiah Hunt and Guy Merrill plat the town of Catlin.
 1867 – Sidell Township is created.
 1868 – Oakwood Township is created.

1870s
 1870 September – Danville High School is established.
 1871 – The town of Hoopeston is founded.
 1872 – Construction on the Pumpkin Vine Railroad begins, to carry coal from south of Covington, Indiana to the Bismarck area.
 1872 – The town of Gilbert is founded south of the future site of Alvin.
 c. 1873 – The town of Bismarck is founded.
 1873 – William P. and E. A. West lay out the town of Westville.
 1875 – The town of Alvin is founded at a new railroad intersection just north of Gilbert, supplanting the earlier town.

1880s
 1883 – The Danville Public Library is formed.
 1884 – The Grand Opera House (later the Fischer Theatre) opens.

1890s
 1894 – The Danville Training School for Nurses (later Lakeview College of Nursing) opens.
 1897 – An Old Soldiers' Home is established on the southeast side of Danville.
 1899 – Jamaica Township is created.

20th century

1900s
 1900 August 2 – Helen Morgan is born in Vermilion County.
 1902 – Love Township is created.
 1904 November 7 – Danville's Carnegie Library opens.
 1905 January – Hoopeston's Carnegie Library is dedicated.

1910s
 1912 – McKendree Township is created.
 1919 – The first Grab It Here grocery store opens.

1920s
 1924 – Danville High School moves to the current building.
 1924 September 15 – Bobby Short is born in Danville.
 1925 December 13 – Dick Van Dyke is born in West Plains, Missouri.
 1927 – South Ross Township is created.

1930s
 1931 July 27 – Jerry Van Dyke is born in Danville.

1940s
 1942 March 16 – The town of Alvin is hit by a tornado at 11:40 AM, killing six people and causing much destruction.
 1946 – The University of Illinois establishes an extension center at Danville High School.
 1949 – The University of Illinois extension becomes Danville Community College.

1950s
 1950 January 21 – Joseph R. Tanner is born in Danville.
 1951 – Danville Community College is renamed Danville Junior College.

1960s
 1965 – Danville Junior College moves to buildings acquired from the Veterans Administration at 2000 East Main Street.
 1966 – Danville Junior College becomes an independent two-year college.

1970s
 1979 – Danville Junior College is renamed Danville Area Community College.

1980s
 1980 September 20 Danville's David S. Palmer Civic Center opens.
 1988 – Lakeview College of Nursing becomes a separate entity when the hospital changes hands.

1990s
 1994 November 3 – Joe Tanner flies aboard Space Shuttle Atlantis on mission STS-66.
 1995 November 7 – The new Danville Public Library building opens.
 1997 February 11 – Joe Tanner flies aboard Space Shuttle Discovery on mission STS-82, performing two space walks.

21st century

2000s
 2000 November 30 – Joe Tanner flies aboard Space Shuttle Endeavour on mission STS-97, performing three space walks.
 2004 February – Several historic buildings in downtown Rossville are destroyed by fire.
 2005 March 21 – Bobby Short dies at the age of 80.
 2006 August 26 – Chittick's Family Eye Care is destroyed by fire.
 2006 September 9 – Joe Tanner flies aboard Space Shuttle Atlantis on mission STS-115, performing a space walk.

2010s
 2017 September 30, October 1 – Vermilion Regional Airport hosts its first air show since 1987.
 2018 January 5 – Jerry Van Dyke dies at age 86.

References

Unless otherwise cited, much of the information from the 19th century and first half of the 20th century is drawn from these works:
 
 

History of Illinois
Vermilion County
Vermilion County, Illinois